The District of Santarém is a district of Portugal, located in Portugal's Centro Region. The district capital is the city of Santarém.

Once part of the historical region of Ribatejo, the district was created by order of the European Union, not taking into consideration historical boundaries or cultures.

Municipalities
The district includes the following 21 municipalities.

 Abrantes
 Alcanena
 Almeirim
 Alpiarça
 Benavente
 Cartaxo
 Chamusca
 Constância
 Coruche
 Entroncamento
 Ferreira do Zêzere
 Golegã
 Mação
 Ourém
 Rio Maior
 Salvaterra de Magos
 Santarém
 Sardoal
 Tomar
 Torres Novas
 Vila Nova da Barquinha

Summary of votes and seats won 1976-2022

|- class="unsortable"
!rowspan=2|Parties!!%!!S!!%!!S!!%!!S!!%!!S!!%!!S!!%!!S!!%!!S!!%!!S!!%!!S!!%!!S!!%!!S!!%!!S!!%!!S!!%!!S!!%!!S!!%!!S
|- class="unsortable" align="center"
!colspan=2 | 1976
!colspan=2 | 1979
!colspan=2 | 1980
!colspan=2 | 1983
!colspan=2 | 1985
!colspan=2 | 1987
!colspan=2 | 1991
!colspan=2 | 1995
!colspan=2 | 1999
!colspan=2 | 2002
!colspan=2 | 2005
!colspan=2 | 2009
!colspan=2 | 2011
!colspan=2 | 2015
!colspan=2 | 2019
!colspan=2 | 2022
|-
| align="left"| PS || style="background:#FF66FF;"|38.4 || style="background:#FF66FF;"|6 || 27.3 || 3 ||30.4 || 4 || style="background:#FF66FF;"|38.4 || style="background:#FF66FF;"|5 || 18.6 || 2 || 21.7 || 3 || 29.4 || 3 || style="background:#FF66FF;"|45.8 || style="background:#FF66FF;"|5  || style="background:#FF66FF;"|45.5 || style="background:#FF66FF;"|5 || style="background:#FF66FF;"|38.4 || style="background:#FF66FF;"|4 || style="background:#FF66FF;"|46.1 || style="background:#FF66FF;"|6 || style="background:#FF66FF;"|33.7 || style="background:#FF66FF;"|4 || 25.9 || 3 || 32.9 || 3 || style="background:#FF66FF;"|37.1 || style="background:#FF66FF;"|4 || style="background:#FF66FF;"|41.2 || style="background:#FF66FF;"|5
|-
| align="left"| PSD || 19.5 || 3 || colspan=4 rowspan=2 align=center| In AD || 24.7 || 3 || style="background:#FF9900;"|27.8 || style="background:#FF9900;"|4 || style="background:#FF9900;"|47.9 || style="background:#FF9900;"|7 || style="background:#FF9900;"|49.1 || style="background:#FF9900;"|6 || 31.0 || 3 || 30.2|| 3 || 38.1 || 4 || 26.4 || 3 || 27.0 || 3 || style="background:#FF9900;"|37.6 || style="background:#FF9900;"|5 || colspan=2 rowspan=2 align=center| In PàF || 25.2 || 3 || 26.9 || 3
|-
| align="left"| CDS-PP || 13.9 || 2 || 10.0 || 1 || 7.7 || 1 || 3.6 ||  || 3.3 ||  || 8.7 || 1 || 8.1 || 1 || 8.4 || 1 || 6.9 ||  || 11.2 || 1 || 12.3 || 1 || 4.7 ||  || 1.9 || 
|-
| align="left"| PCP/APU/CDU || 16.1 || 2 || 21.7|| 3 || 19.0 || 2 || 20.0 || 3 || 16.4 || 2 || 12.6 || 1 || 9.8 || 1 || 9.5 || 1 || 10.1 || 1 || 8.6 || 1 || 8.6 || 1 || 9.2 || 1 || 9.0 || 1 || 9.6 || 1 || 7.6 || 1 || 5.4 || 
|-
| align="left"| AD || colspan=2| || style="background:#00FFFF;"|41.0 || style="background:#00FFFF;"|6 || style="background:#00FFFF;"|42.1 || style="background:#00FFFF;"|6 || colspan=26|
|-
| align="left"| PRD || colspan=8| || 23.8 || 3 || 7.3 || 1 || 1.0 ||  || colspan=18|
|-
| align="left"| BE || colspan=16| || 2.0 ||  || 2.8 ||  || 6.5 ||  || 11.8 || 1 || 5.8 ||  || 10.8 || 1 || 10.2 || 1 || 4.6 || 
|-
| align="left"| PàF || colspan=26| || style="background:#00AAAA;"|35.8 || style="background:#00AAAA;"|4 || colspan=4|
|-
| align="left"| CHEGA || colspan=28| || 2.0 ||  || 10.9 || 1
|-
! align="left"| Total seats || colspan=2|13 || colspan=10|12 || colspan=14|10 || colspan=6|9
|-
! colspan=33| Source: Comissão Nacional de Eleições
|}

Archeology

The village of Almonda, within the civil parish of Zibreira, is noted for the Aroeira cave, where the 400,000 year old Aroeira 3 skull of a Homo Heidelbergensis was discovered in 2014. It is the oldest trace of human habitation in Portugal.

See also
 Arripiado, a village in the district of Santarém
 1909 Benavente earthquake, a deadly seismic event centered in the district

References

 
Districts of Portugal